Sukhera people inhabit Southern Pakistani Punjab and in adjacent areas of India on the opposite side of border. 

Punjabi tribes